The Croxley Master is a 1921 British silent drama film directed by Percy Nash. It was based on a short story by Arthur Conan Doyle. A young Welsh medical student enters the boxing ring to fight for a £200 prize which will enable him to establish his own practice.

Cast
 Dick Webb as Robert Montgomery 
 Dora Lennox as Dorothy Oldacre 
 Jack Stanley as Silas Craggs   
 Joan Ritz as Anastasia Craggs 
 Cecil Morton York as Doctor Oldacre 
 Louis Rihll as Mr.  
 Mabel Penn as Mrs. Oldacre 
 J.T. MacMillan as Mr. Purvis 
 George Turner as Mr. Fawcett 
 Ernest Wallace as Mr. Wilson

References

External links

1921 films
1920s sports drama films
1921 drama films
British boxing films
British silent feature films
British sports drama films
Films directed by Percy Nash
Films based on short fiction
Films set in Wales
British black-and-white films
1920s English-language films
1920s British films
Silent sports drama films